soL ("Left" in Turkish) is a left-leaning newspaper in Turkey.

Supplements
The newspaper publishes the following sections throughout the week: 
soL Güncel (Sol Daily),
soL Kitap (Sol Literature), 
soL Kültür (Sol Culture), 
BilimsoL (Science Sol), 
Tercüme Odası (Interpretation Room), 
soL Bakış (Sol Viewpoint) 

On Sunday, the publication has additional supplements.

Columnists
The columnists of the newspaper are:

Ahmet Abakay
Asaf Güven Aksel
Aslı Kayabal
Aydemir Güler
Emrah Kartal
Erbil Tuşalp
Fırat Tanış
İlhan Cihaner
İzzettin Önder
Kemal Okuyan
Kerem Esenoğlu
Korkut Boratav
Mehmet Bozkurt
Mete Gönenç
Metin Çulhaoğlu
Oğuz Oyan
Ömer Faruk Eminağaoğlu
Pınar Aydınlar
Renan Bilek
Rıfat Okçabol
Şükran Yiğit
Yavuz Alogan

References

External links
Official website of the newspaper
Facebookpage of the newspaper

Turkish-language newspapers